Carlos Gabriel Kattán Salem (born 17 September 1957) is a Honduran economist, businessman and politician. He served as deputy of the National Congress of Honduras representing the National Party of Honduras for Cortés during the 2006-2010 period.

He also served as member of the National Commission of Energy during 2010.

References

1957 births
Living people
People from Cortés Department
Honduran businesspeople
Deputies of the National Congress of Honduras
National Party of Honduras politicians